SCALPEL (Small Contained-Area Laser Precision Energetic Load) is a laser-guided bomb produced by Lockheed Martin.  The weapon is being developed from the Enhanced Laser Guided Training Round (E-LGTR) which is the training version of the Paveway II series of bombs.  The rationale behind the system is to provide a light, low-collateral damage weapon which can utilise the infrastructure and platform integration already in place for the E-LGTR system. On 14 March 2010, the US Navy announced its intention to purchase Scalpel. The Navy completed some integration work in 2011 and the weapon was still self-funded as of 2016, but Scalpel could be ready for operations in "a year or two" depending if a launch customer commits extra funding and test range support. The Scalpel Plus version has a dual-mode SAL/GPS guidance system.

Specifications
 Weight: 100 lbs (45.3 kg)
 Length: 75 in (1905 mm)
 Diameter: 4 in (102 mm)
 Guidance: Semi-active laser homing.

Program status
 May 2008 – Three inert weapons successfully carried and released by AV-8B Harriers.

See also
List of laser articles

References

External links
 SCALPEL | Lockheed Martin
 Another Hundred Pound Wonder Weapon – Strategy Page

Guided bombs of the United States
Lockheed Corporation